In Ohio folklore, the Loveland frog (also known as the Loveland frogman or Loveland lizard) is a legendary humanoid frog described as standing roughly  tall, allegedly spotted in Loveland, Ohio. In 1972, the Loveland frog legend gained renewed attention when a Loveland police officer reported to a colleague that he had seen an animal consistent with descriptions of the frogman. After a reported sighting in 2016, the second officer called a news station to report that he had shot and killed the same creature some weeks after the 1972 incident and had identified it as a large iguana that was missing its tail.

University of Cincinnati folklore professor Edgar Slotkin compared the Loveland frog to Paul Bunyan, saying that stories about it have been passed down for "several decades" and that sighting reports seem to come in predictable cycles.

In May 2014, the Loveland frog legend was made into a musical, titled Hot Damn! It's the Loveland Frog!. In 2019, artist Dogdied created a song Hot Damn! I'm the Loveland Frog!

Legends
According to various legends, the creature was first sighted by a businessman or a traveling salesman driving along an unnamed road late at night in 1955, with some versions of the story specifying the month of May. In one story, the driver was heading out of the Branch Hill neighborhood when he spotted three figures stood erect on their hind legs along the side of the road, each  in height, with leathery skin and frog faces. In other versions of the story, the creatures were spotted under or over a poorly lit bridge, and one held a wand over its head that fired a spray of sparks.

Loveland police reports
On March 3, 1972, at 1:00am, Loveland police officer Ray Shockey was driving on Riverside Drive near the Totes boot factory and the Little Miami River when an unidentified animal scurried across the road in front of his vehicle. He reported spotting the animal "crouched like a frog" before it momentarily stood erect to climb over the guardrail and back down towards the river.

Two weeks after the incident, a second Loveland police officer, Mark Matthews, reported seeing an unidentified animal crouched along the road in the same vicinity as Shockey's sighting. Matthews shot the animal, recovered the body, and put it in his trunk to show officer Shockey. Mathews speculated the iguana had been someone's pet that "either got loose or was released when it grew too large". According to Mathews, Shockey was shown the dead iguana and confirmed it was the animal he had seen two weeks previously. Matthews recounted the incident to an author of a book about urban legends, but says the author "omitted the part that confirmed that the creature was an iguana rather than a Frogman". Mathews also recounted the frogman story in 2016 again on WCPO channel 9.

In fiction
James Renner's science fiction/mystery novel The Man From Primrose Lane features a version of the Loveland frog.

References

American folklore
American legendary creatures
Legendary amphibians
Loveland, Ohio
Ohio culture
Frogs
Hoaxes
Piscine and amphibian humanoids